Friendsville can refer to a location in the United States:

Friendsville, Illinois
Friendsville, Maryland
Friendsville, Ohio
Friendsville, Pennsylvania
Friendsville, Tennessee

See also
Friendville (disambiguation)